Tiffani Amber Thiessen (born January 23, 1974) is an American actress who starred as Kelly Kapowski on NBC's Saved by the Bell (1989–1993), as Valerie Malone on Fox's Beverly Hills, 90210 (1994–98), and as Lori on Netflix's Alexa & Katie (2018–2020). Thiessen has also starred in other TV series such as Fox's Fastlane (2002–2003), ABC's What About Brian (2007), and USA Network's White Collar (2009–2014), as well as in a number of TV movies, and she has also appeared in several films, such as Son in Law (1993), Shriek If You Know What I Did Last Friday the 13th (2000), Hollywood Ending (2002) and Cyborg Soldier (2008).

Early life
Thiessen was born in Long Beach, California, the daughter of Robyn (née Ernest), a homemaker, and Frank Thiessen, a park designer and landscape architect. She has credited her brother, Todd, as one of her most important sources of inspiration, and her mother and grandmother as role models. Thiessen told InStyle magazine: "I'm a mutt. I have so much of everything in me, and half of it I don't even know. German on one side, Greek, Turkish and Welsh on the other. My mom is very olive-skinned; I get my blue eyes from my dad."

Career
Thiessen participated in beauty pageants during her childhood and was crowned Miss Junior America in 1987. The following year, she appeared on the cover of Teen magazine, having won the magazine's "Great Model Search". In 1989, she was named Cover Girls "Model of the Year", and landed her first role of Kelly Kapowski on NBC's television sitcom Saved by the Bell, starring until its end in 1993. The success of the show gave her career a boost and Thiessen received Young Artist Award nominations for Outstanding Young Ensemble Cast in 1990 and Best Young Actress in an Off-Primetime Series in 1992 and 1993. Simultaneously, Thiessen guest-starred on series such as Married... with Children, Charles in Charge and Step by Step. In 1992, she starred in her first television movies Saved by the Bell: Hawaiian Style and A Killer Among Friends, making her film debut in Son in Law in 1993. She then continued with starring in spin-off Saved by the Bell: The College Years in its single season (1993–94) and in television movie Saved by the Bell: Wedding in Las Vegas (1994), which marked the end of the original Saved by the Bell series.

In 1994, after her tenure on Saved by the Bell had ended, Thiessen landed the role of Valerie Malone in Fox's Aaron Spelling-produced hit teen-drama Beverly Hills, 90210, to fill the void after Shannen Doherty's departure. She was the first actress to join directly the main cast of the show and portrayed Valerie until 1998, when she left in the early episodes of the ninth season of the show. While starring in 90210, Thiessen began to take on continuous dramatic leading roles in television films: The Stranger Beside Me (1995) and She Fought Alone (1995), Sweet Dreams and Buried Secrets in 1996. After her departure from the show, she appeared in a number of films, including Speedway Junky (1999), From Dusk Till Dawn 2: Texas Blood Money (1999), Love Stinks (1999) and The Ladies Man (2000); she also guest-starred on NewsRadio (1999), Two Guys and a Girl (2000), Just Shoot Me! (2001) and Good Morning, Miami (2003–04). In 2000, she was featured in the music video for "You're a God" by Vertical Horizon, portraying a beauty pageant contestant, in her first music video appearance. That year she also dropped her middle name which she had been including professionally for many years and is now credited as simply Tiffani Thiessen. Thiessen was Spelling's first choice to replace Doherty in the series Charmed in 2001, but she refused his offer because she was hoping the NBC pilot for Everything But the Girl would be picked up. The role eventually went to Rose McGowan.

Meanwhile, Thiessen starred in direct-to-video parody film Shriek If You Know What I Did Last Friday the Thirteenth (2000) and in television movie Everything But the Girl (2001), before appearing in the Woody Allen-directed film Hollywood Ending (2002) and starring in action-drama series Fastlane (2002–03) as Wilhelmina 'Billie' Chambers, for which she received a Teen Choice Award nomination for Choice TV Actress in Drama/Action Adventure. In 2003, she launched her production company Tit 4 Tat Productions, producing and directing the short film Just Pray in 2005, which earned distinctions at several film festivals, including winning Best Score at the Rhode Island International Film Festival, an Academy Award qualifying festival. The original motion picture soundtrack album, co-produced by Thiessen and Al Gomes of Big Noise, was placed on the Official Ballot for the 49th Annual Grammy Awards by The Recording Academy in several categories including Best Compilation Soundtrack Album For Motion Picture, Television or Other Visual Media.

Later on, she starred in television movies Stroller Wars (2006) and Pandemic (2007), she joined the cast of ABC's drama What About Brian (2007) for its last five episodes and starred in the science fiction film Cyborg Soldier (2008). In 2008, she made her second music video appearance, this time for Ben Lee's "American Television". Thiessen appeared with her husband Brady Smith on the September 6, 2009 episode of season four of the reality show HGTV Design Star. Interior designer Lonni Paul, one of the final three contestants of the season, was given the task of redesigning Thiessen's guest bedroom with an eco-friendly theme; Thiessen and Paul now have a nursery furniture line called PetitNest. From 2009 through 2014 Thiessen appeared in the USA Network crime series White Collar as Elizabeth Burke.

On February 4, 2015, Thiessen reunited with Saved By the Bell costars Mark-Paul Gosselaar, Elizabeth Berkley, Dennis Haskins and Mario Lopez on The Tonight Show Starring Jimmy Fallon, in which they appeared in a Saved by the Bell sketch with host Jimmy Fallon. In the same year, Thiessen started hosting her own show on Cooking Channel called Dinner at Tiffani's, which ran until 2017.

On June 7, 2017, Thiessen was cast as Lori Mendoza, mother of the Mendoza family on the multi camera Netflix sitcom Alexa & Katie, which premiered its first two seasons on March 23 and December 26, 2018.

In March 2020, it was announced that Thiessen would join the cast of the Saved by the Bell sequel series, reprising her role as Kelly Kapowski. She guest-starred in three episodes. The show premiered on NBCUniversal's streaming network Peacock beginning November 2020. In November, it was announced that Thiessen would host the MTV comedy clip show Deliciousness, a spinoff of that network's previous program, Ridiculousness.

Charity work
In April 2013, she participated in the One Bag party as part of Earth Month, in which the Glad company promoted "clean, green living".

Public image
Thiessen was a teen idol during the 1990s, starting from her role as cheerleader Kelly Kapowski on Saved by the Bell and then playing bad girl Valerie Malone on Beverly Hills, 90210. In a much-discussed moment, Justin Bieber appeared wearing a T-shirt with a photo of Thiessen in her Saved by the Bell days at the 2011 MuchMusic Video Awards, admitting his admiration for her. Basketball player Chris Paul also revealed publicly that he was a fan of Thiessen back then, when she sent him an autographed 
Saved by the Bell-era photograph of herself for his 29th birthday in 2014.

Personal life
Thiessen dated her Saved By the Bell co-star Mark-Paul Gosselaar (who played Zack in the show). She also dated Mario Lopez, who played A.C. Slater, from 1991 to November 1993.

In early 1992, Thiessen started dating her future 90210 co-star Brian Austin Green, introduced by mutual friend David Faustino; they moved in together in July 1994, then broke up the next year. In 1999, she went through a difficult period in her personal life, when David Strickland, also an actor, whom she had begun dating, committed suicide. From 2001 to the spring of 2003, she was engaged to actor Richard Ruccolo, whom she had met during the Two Guys and a Girl run. She married actor Brady Smith on July 9, 2005, and they have two children: a daughter born in 2010, and a son born in 2015.

Thiessen served as maid of honor at 90210 co-star and best friend Jennie Garth's 2001 wedding to actor Peter Facinelli, with whom she co-starred on Fastlane. Garth and Thiessen's friendship has since come to an end. Her friendship with fellow 90210 star Tori Spelling also ended after Spelling's marriage to her first husband ended.

Filmography

Television

Film

Accolades

References

External links

 
 

1974 births
Living people
20th-century American actresses
21st-century American actresses
Actresses from Long Beach, California
American people of German descent
American people of Greek descent
American people of Turkish descent
American people of Welsh descent
American child actresses
American film actresses
American television actresses
American voice actresses